Montravel Rock is a rock lying  northwest of Cape Legoupil off the northwest coast of Trinity Peninsula, Antarctica. It was discovered in February 1838 by Captain Jules Dumont d'Urville, who named it for Ensign Louis Tardy de Montravel of the expedition ship Zélée.

References

External links

Rock formations of the Trinity Peninsula